Clochafarmore is a menhir (standing stone) and  National Monument in County Louth, Ireland.

Location

History and legend

The standing stone, 3 metres high, was erected at an unknown point in the distant past, believed to be during the  Bronze Age.

This standing stone is traditionally associated with the death of the legendary hero Cúchulainn. Lugaid mac Con Roí has three magical spears made, and it is prophesied that a king will fall by each of them. With the first he kills Cú Chulainn's charioteer Láeg; with the second he kills Cú Chulainn's horse, Liath Macha; with the third he hits Cú Chulainn, mortally wounding him. Cú Chulainn ties himself to a standing stone — traditionally Clochafarmore ("Stone of the Big Man"), which had been erected to mark the grave of a past great warrior.

Cú Chulainn continues to fight his enemies, and it is only when a raven (the traditional form of The Morrígan) lands on his shoulder that his enemies believe he is dead. Lugaid approaches and beheads him, but as he does so the "hero-light" burns around Cú Chulainn and his sword falls from his hand and cuts Lugaid's hand off. The light disappears only after his right hand is cut off. 

The region is known as An Breisleach Mór, "The Great Carnage", while the field in which this stone stands is called the Field of Slaughter. In the 1920s a bronze spearhead was found in the field, perhaps showing it to be a genuine ancient battle-site.

References

Archaeological sites in County Louth
National Monuments in County Louth